Charles Joseph Sainte-Claire Deville (26 February 1814 – 10 October 1876) was a geologist and meteorologist. 

Born in St. Thomas, he was the brother of chemist Henri Etienne Sainte-Claire Deville.

Having attended at the École des Mines in Paris, he assisted Élie de Beaumont in the chair of geology at the Collège de France from 1855 until he succeeded him in 1874. He made researches on volcanic phenomena, especially on the gaseous emanations. He investigated also the variations of temperature in the atmosphere and ocean. In 1857, he is elected member of the French Academy of Sciences in replacement of Armand Dufrénoy.

In 1852 he was one of the founders of the Société Météorologique de France, of which, he served as its first secretary. In 1859 he was the first to achieve a complete ascent of Grand Combin (4314 meters) in the Pennine Alps. He is promoted Officier de la Légion d'honneur in 1862. He died in Paris.

The Promontorium Deville, a lunar headland, was named after him.

Publications
His published works include: 
 Études géologiques sur les îles de Ténériffe et de Fogo (1848) – Geological studies on the islands of Tenerife and Fogo.
 Recherches sur les principaux phénomènes de météorologie et de physique terrestre aux Antilles (1849) – Research on the principal phenomena involving meteorology and terrestrial physics of the Antilles.
 Voyage géologique aux Antilles et aux îles de Ténériffe et de fogo (1856–1864) – Geological voyage to the Antilles and the islands of Tenerife and Fogo.
 Lettres à Élie de Beaumont sur l'éruption du Vésuve – Letters to Élie de Beaumont on the eruption of Vesuvius. 
 Les éruptions actuelles du Volcan de Stromboli (1858) – The actual eruptions of the Stromboli volcano.  
 Sur les variations périodiques de la température (1866) – On the periodic variations of temperature.

References

External links
 Catholic Encyclopedia article

1814 births
1876 deaths
Academic staff of the Collège de France
French geologists
French volcanologists
French meteorologists
Presidents of the Société entomologique de France